Electrolysed water (electrolyzed water, EOW, ECA, electrolyzed oxidizing water, electro-activated water or electro-chemically activated water solution) is produced by the electrolysis of ordinary tap water containing dissolved sodium chloride. The electrolysis of such salt solutions produces a solution of hypochlorous acid and sodium hydroxide. The resulting water can be used as a disinfectant.

Creation
The electrolysis occurs in a specially designed reactor which allows the separation of the cathodic and anodic solutions. In this process, hydrogen gas and hydroxide ions can be produced at the cathode, leading to an alkaline solution that consists essentially of sodium hydroxide. At the anode, chloride ions can be oxidized to elemental chlorine, which is present in acidic solution and can be corrosive to metals. If the solution near the anode is acidic then it will contain elemental chlorine, if it is alkaline then it will comprise sodium hydroxide.  The key to delivering a powerful sanitising agent is to form hypochlorous acid without elemental chlorine - this occurs at around neutral pH.  Hypochlorous is a weak acid and an oxidizing agent. This "acidic electrolyzed water" can be raised in pH by mixing in the desired amount of hydroxide ion solution from the cathode compartment, yielding a solution of Hypochlorous acid (HOCl) and sodium hydroxide (NaOH).  A solution whose pH is 7.3 will contain equal concentrations of hypochlorous acid and hypochlorite ion; reducing the pH will shift the balance toward the hypochlorous acid.  At a pH between 5.5 and 6.0 approximately 90% of the ions are in the form of hypochlorous acid.  In that pH range, the disinfectant capability of the solution is more effective than regular sodium hypochlorite (household bleach).

Efficient disinfectant
Both sodium hydroxide and hypochlorous acid are efficient disinfecting agents; as mentioned above, the key to effective sanitation is to have a high proportion of hypochlorous acid present, this happens between acidic and neutral pH conditions.

EOW will kill spores and many viruses and bacteria.

Electrolysis units sold for industrial and institutional disinfectant use and for municipal water-treatment are known as chlorine generators. These avoid the need to ship and store chlorine, as well as the weight penalty of shipping prepared chlorine solutions. In March, 2016 inexpensive units have become available for home or small business users.

EPA registration

Although the field of electro-chemical activation (ECA) technology has existed for more than 40 years, companies producing such solutions have only recently approached the U.S. Environmental Protection Agency (EPA) seeking registration. Recently, a number of companies that manufacture electrolytic devices have sought and received EPA registration as a disinfectant.

Drawbacks
Electrolyzed alkaline ionized water loses its potency fairly quickly, so it cannot be stored for long.  But, acidic ionized water (a byproduct of electrolysis) will store indefinitely (until used or evaporated). Electrolysis machines can be but are not necessarily expensive.  In some but not all instances the electrolysis process needs to be monitored frequently for the correct potency.

See also
Disinfectant
Electrolysis of water
Water ionizer
Electrodeionization
Electrochemical engineering
Degree of ionization
Mixed oxidant

References

Water
Electrolysis
Disinfectants
Chemistry